Helen Maree Watson (born 17 February 1972) is a New Zealand former cricketer who played as an all-rounder, bowling right-arm medium and batting right-handed. She appeared in 66 One Day Internationals and 8 Twenty20 Internationals for New Zealand between 1999 and 2008. She played domestic cricket for Canterbury and Auckland. Following her playing career, Watson became a financial officer.

References

External links
 
 

1972 births
Living people
Sportspeople from Ashburton, New Zealand
New Zealand women cricketers
New Zealand women One Day International cricketers
New Zealand women Twenty20 International cricketers
Auckland Hearts cricketers
Canterbury Magicians cricketers